John II of Liechtenstein was a 15th-century nobleman and member of the council of Jobst of Moravia.

John II helped King Wenceslaus IV escape to Vienna from his second imprisonment on 11 November 1403. Wenceslas was able to initially escape his prison wearing a disguise. He crossed the Danube, where John II was waiting for him with a guard of fifty horsemen who escorted him to Mikulov Castle.

In 1405, Margrave Jobst paid a ransom for John II after he was captured in his service.

In popular culture
A fictionalized John appears in the 2018 video game Kingdom Come: Deliverance. In the game, he is shown with Margrave Jobst, Divish of Talmberg, Hans Capon, Hanush of Leipa, and Radzig Kobyla planning on how to defeat Sigismund and free Wenceslaus from captivity.

References

House of Liechtenstein
15th-century people of the Holy Roman Empire
Date of death unknown
Date of birth unknown